Randall Duane Couture (born June 22, 1963) is an American actor, former U.S. Army sergeant, former mixed martial artist and former collegiate and Greco-Roman wrestler. During his tenures in the Ultimate Fighting Championship (UFC), he became a three-time UFC Heavyweight Champion, two-time UFC Light heavyweight Champion, an interim UFC Light heavyweight Champion, making him a six-time UFC Champion and the UFC 13 Heavyweight Tournament winner. He is the first of eight fighters to hold two UFC championship titles in two different divisions (along with B.J. Penn, Conor McGregor, Georges St-Pierre, Daniel Cormier, Amanda Nunes, Henry Cejudo and Jon Jones).

Couture has competed in a record 16 title fights. He is tied for the record for the most wins in UFC Heavyweight Championship bouts (6) with former UFC Heavyweight champion Stipe Miocic. He had the most title reigns in the UFC, with six. His last fight with Lyoto Machida marked his 24th fight in the UFC. He is the fourth member of the UFC Hall of Fame. He is one of only 2 over the age of 40 to have won a UFC championship fight, having done so four times. He is one of the few MMA champions to regain a title he had lost, and the only to have done it three times (twice at heavyweight, once at light heavyweight).

Couture was an Olympic wrestling alternate and has lived in Corvallis, Oregon throughout much of his career, where he served as an assistant wrestling coach and a strength and conditioning coach for Oregon State University. He established Team Quest with Matt Lindland and Dan Henderson, a training camp for fighters, based out of Gresham, Oregon, and headed by coach Robert Folis. In 2005, he moved to Las Vegas, where he opened his own extensive chain of gyms under the name Xtreme Couture. He partnered with Bas Rutten to open Legends Gym in Hollywood, California.

Couture is generally recognized as a clinch and ground-and-pound fighter who uses his wrestling ability to execute take downs, establish top position and successively strike the opponent on the bottom. He has displayed a variety of skills in boxing and catch wrestling. He is the only UFC fighter to win a championship after becoming a Hall-of-Famer and is the oldest champion in MMA history with his title victory over Tim Sylvia at age 43.

Background
Couture was born in Everett, Washington, the son of Sharan Amelia (née King) and Edward Lewis "Ed" Couture. He wrestled at Alderwood Middle School in Lynnwood, Washington, then moved on to Lynnwood High School, where he won a State Championship during his senior year in wrestling. He served in the U.S. Army from 1982 to 1988, attaining the rank of Sergeant in the 101st Airborne, where he "wrestled and did a little boxing."

While he was in the Army he applied for tryouts with the U.S. Army Freestyle Wrestling team; however, due to a clerical error his application was sent to the Greco-Roman tryouts and rather than wait until the next year he decided to pursue it. Despite never having competed in Greco-Roman he made the team.

Upon discharge, Couture became a three-time Olympic team alternate (1988, 1992 and 1996), a semifinalist at the 2000 Olympic Trials, a three-time NCAA Division I All-American and a two-time NCAA Division I runner-up (1991 and 1992) at Oklahoma State University.

Mixed martial arts career

Ultimate Fighting Championship and RINGS
Being called to the tournament as an alternate on three weeks' notice, Couture made his professional mixed martial arts debut at UFC 13 on May 30, 1997, as part of a four-man heavyweight tournament. Couture immediately hit a double-leg takedown and, after some ground and pound, moved to back mount and secured a rear naked choke submission to win in under a minute. In the tournament final, he defeated Steven Graham, another larger opponent (290 lb), by TKO at 3:13 into the first round.

On October 17, 1997, at UFC 15, Couture fought Vitor Belfort to determine the number one contender for the UFC Heavyweight Championship. Couture was an underdog, as 19-year-old Belfort was the UFC 12 Heavyweight Tournament Champion, winning all of his matches with devastating punches. After circling away from Belfort's left hand, Couture got the clinch. The fighters broke up and, when Belfort attempted a flurry of punches, Couture hit a takedown. He immediately gained side control and landed strikes. As Belfort scrambled to his feet, Couture landed knee strikes. He clinched again and wore Belfort down with dirty boxing. By the 7-minute mark, Belfort was exhausted. Couture again took him down, and finished him with punches from back mount, for one of the biggest upsets in MMA at the time.

At UFC Japan on December 21, Couture challenged the UFC Heavyweight Champion, Maurice Smith to his second title defense since winning the belt from Mark Coleman earlier that year. It was a slow-paced fight, and neither fighter significantly damaged the other, but Couture hit several takedowns and held positional control throughout the fight. After 21 minutes, he won a majority decision and became the new UFC Heavyweight Champion. Though this win was controversial as many believe Smith did enough to win the fight.

In 1998, UFC matchmakers wanted Couture to defend the belt against Bas Rutten, former King of Pancrase. Couture instead signed with Vale Tudo Japan, and was stripped of the title. He had his first and only match against Shooto veteran and grappling especialist Enson Inoue. After taking the fight to the ground, Couture tapped out to an armbar, just over 90 seconds into the bout.

Still in Japan, Couture was signed up with Fighting Network RINGS, debuting against Mikhail Illoukhine on March 20, 1999, in RINGS. Couture submitted to a kimura, though the loss was controversial due to Illoukhine locking the hold while they were being re-positioned on the center of the ring. After that loss, he took a break from MMA to focus on his amateur wrestling career.

Couture returned to MMA in October 2000, for the RINGS King of Kings Tournament 2000. He won a unanimous decision over UFC veteran Jeremy Horn in his first fight, and then another over Pancrase veteran Ryūshi Yanagisawa. These two wins qualified him for the final event of the tournament, in March 2001. Before that, he was offered a shot at the UFC Heavyweight Championship against Kevin Randleman on November 17, 2000. He was taken down in the first two rounds, but defended well from his back, negating most of Randleman's ground and pound attempts. In the third round, he tripped Randleman to the mat and landed several strikes from full mount for a TKO victory and his second UFC Heavyweight Championship.

In March 2001, Couture continued in the RINGS King of Kings Tournament 2000 Final. After winning an even decision over veteran Tsuyoshi Kohsaka in the first fight, he got caught in a guillotine choke by Valentijn Overeem after committing himself in a takedown and had to submit. Antônio Rodrigo Nogueira won the tournament, and Couture returned to the UFC.

His first title defense was against Brazilian kickboxer Pedro Rizzo, at UFC 31. This was the first UFC event under Zuffa management, with Dana White as the new president. Both fighters inflicted substantial damage. After five 5-minute rounds, Couture won a close unanimous decision. Some fans felt Rizzo had won, so the UFC set up an immediate rematch for UFC 34, in November 2001. This time, Couture won decisively by TKO in the third round.

His third title defense was in March 2002, against up-and-comer Josh Barnett. In the second round, Barnett mounted Couture and landed several strikes to win the title by TKO. After the fight, it was revealed Barnett had tested positive for anabolic steroids. He was subsequently stripped of the title and cut from the UFC.

Couture then faced Ricco Rodriguez for the vacant UFC Heavyweight Championship at UFC 39, in late 2002. After dominating the first three rounds, 39-year-old Couture became noticeably fatigued. In the fifth round, Rodriguez took him down and landed an elbow strike to his orbital bone, breaking it and making him submit. This was the first time a UFC fight had finished in the fifth round.

Move to light heavyweight and trilogy with Chuck Liddell

After two consecutive losses to larger opponents in the heavyweight division, Couture moved down to the light heavyweight division. In his light heavyweight debut, he fought long-time number one contender Chuck Liddell for the UFC Interim Light heavyweight Championship. He was again the underdog but, after outstriking Liddell for three rounds, took the fight to the ground and won by TKO via strikes from full mount, becoming the first UFC fighter to win titles in two weight classes.

His next match, against five-time defending champion Tito Ortiz, was billed as a "Champion vs. Champion" fight. 40-year-old Couture won a unanimous decision to become the undisputed UFC Light heavyweight Champion.

Couture's first title defense was against Vitor Belfort, whom he had previously defeated in 1997 at UFC 15. In the first round, as Couture closed the distance to attempt a clinch, Belfort grazed his right eye with a left hook. His glove opened a cut, and Belfort was declared the winner when the cageside doctor advised the fight be stopped. A rubber match took place later that year. Couture dominated all three rounds before winning by doctor stoppage due to a cut, and became a two-time UFC Light heavyweight Champion.

On April 16, 2005, in a rematch with Liddell, Couture lost his title and suffered the first knockout loss of his career. He came back in August to defeat Mike van Arsdale and reestablish himself as a top contender. He faced Liddell for the third and final time in a championship match at UFC 57, on February 4, 2006. He was knocked out in the second round and, immediately afterwards, announced his retirement from MMA.

On June 24, 2006, on The Ultimate Fighter 3 Finale, Couture became the fourth inductee to the UFC Hall of Fame, joining Royce Gracie, Dan Severn, and Ken Shamrock.

Retirement
After retiring from MMA, Couture became a regular broadcast commentator for UFC events and co-host of Before the Bell and After the Bell on The Fight Network. He appeared in the Rob Schneider movie Big Stan, with fellow mixed martial artists Don Frye and Bob Sapp.

On November 17, 2006, Couture fought and drew with Brazilian jiu-jitsu champion Ronaldo "Jacare" Souza in a submission wrestling contest. After the match Couture invited Souza to train at his gym. Souza accepted and started training at Xtreme Couture in Las Vegas.

Couture was featured in the season two premiere episode of the Spike TV show Pros vs. Joes, which aired January 25, 2007. His teammates on the episode were Michael Irvin, Kevin Willis, and José Canseco. He returned for the finale, where he took part in a football-based round. His teammates were Willis, Randall Cunningham, Bruce Smith, Roy Jones Jr., and Tim Hardaway.

Reclaiming the Heavyweight Championship

On January 11, 2007, Couture announced his return from retirement in an interview on the Spike TV magazine show, "Inside the UFC". In a conversation with Joe Rogan, he confirmed he would face Tim Sylvia for the UFC Heavyweight Championship at UFC 68, on March 3, 2007. He also announced he had signed a four-fight, two-year deal with the UFC.

At the age of 43, Couture defeated Sylvia by unanimous decision to become UFC Heavyweight Champion for a third time (a UFC record). Couture's first punch, eight seconds into the fight, sent the  (2.03 m) Sylvia to the mat. He controlled the pace of the fight for five rounds, smothering Sylvia with strikes and numerous takedowns. All three judges scored the bout 50–45 for Couture.

At UFC 74 on August 25, 2007, Couture successfully defended the title against Brazilian Gabriel Gonzaga, defeating him via TKO by strikes. Couture suffered a broken left arm when he blocked one of Gonzaga's kicks. The kick cleanly split his ulna, requiring him to wear a splint for six weeks.

Resignation and dispute with the UFC
On October 11, 2007, Couture announced he was severing all ties with the UFC, leaving two contracted fights, a position as an on-air analyst and the UFC Heavyweight Championship behind. He received $250,000 (plus $936,000 of PPV revenue) for his comeback fight with Tim Sylvia. He received a $250,000 purse for defeating Gabriel Gonzaga (plus a $35,000 "Fight of the Night" bonus and $787,000 in PPV revenue). He complained Chuck Liddell was allegedly paid more than he was, despite losing his previous two fights. Couture cited the UFC's failure to sign #1 ranked Heavyweight fighter Fedor Emelianenko, as well as disputes with UFC management, for his decision.

Transition from Fighter to Coach
Couture coached Oregon Fighter Musio Chavez for the Inter-collegiate Fight League.

On October 18, 2007, UFC president Dana White said Couture remained the UFC Heavyweight Champion despite his plans to quit, and reiterated he would not release Couture from the final two fights on his contract. Couture held a press conference on October 25, 2007, where he denied his departure from UFC was a "retirement", set forth his grievances about his pay, and reiterated his belief that he would be free from any contractual obligations to the UFC after nine months.

On October 30, 2007, White and Zuffa CEO Lorenzo Fertitta held another press conference, where White reiterated the UFC's position of twelve days prior, and released documents refuting Couture's claims about the pay he received.

They met again on Thanksgiving weekend to discuss a possible UFC return, but Couture said he had no desire to do so at the time.

Cornering some of his fighters from Xtreme Couture at HDNet Fights on December 15 in Dallas, Couture answered questions about Fedor Emelianenko, stating that he would like to fight him in October, once his UFC contract expired, if the UFC could not come to a co-promotion agreement with Russia's M-1 Global beforehand.

On January 15, 2008, Zuffa filed a lawsuit in Clark County District Court in Nevada, citing breach of contract and irreparable damage, seeking over $10,000 in damages. This suit only concerned Couture's employment contract and not his promotional contract. On February 28, 2008, Judge Jennifer Togliatti handed down the first ruling in the case, issuing a preliminary injunction barring Couture from participating in an IFL event held the following day.

On August 2, 2008, a Texas appeals court granted Zuffa's request for a stay against a motion for a declaratory judgment in a suit filed by HDNet regarding Couture's contractual status with the UFC. The stay effectively ended the dispute in the state of Texas, and Zuffa was allowed to move forward with the Nevada suit.

Return to the UFC
On September 2, 2008, the UFC announced it had signed Couture to a new three-fight contract. On November 15, he returned at UFC 91 in Las Vegas, Nevada, where he lost the UFC Heavyweight Championship to Brock Lesnar. At first a closely contested match, Lesnar knocked Couture down in the second round and struck him with hammerfists for a TKO victory at 3:07. In a post-fight interview with Joe Rogan, Couture declared his desire to keep fighting and said he felt he was still becoming a better fighter, blaming the loss on his performance, not his age.

On August 29, 2009, Couture faced former UFC Interim Heavyweight Champion and former PRIDE Heavyweight Champion Antônio Rodrigo Nogueira at UFC 102 in Portland, Oregon, and lost by unanimous decision (30–27, 30–27, and 29–28). After the bout, Couture stated he felt he was in the best shape of his life, and would wait and see what the UFC had in store for him. The fight received the "Fight of the Night" award.

Return to light heavyweight and retirement
After the Nogueira loss, Couture signed a new six-fight deal, which superseded his previous contract.

On November 14, 2009, at UFC 105, Couture faced Brandon Vera. Vera landed effective strikes and scored a takedown, but Couture won a somewhat controversial unanimous decision. The fight was his first at Light heavyweight since losing to Chuck Liddell in 2006. With the win, the 46-year-old Couture became the oldest fighter to win a UFC bout.

Couture fought fellow UFC Hall of Famer Mark Coleman at UFC 109. The bout marked the first time UFC Hall of Famers fought each other in the UFC. They were scheduled to meet at UFC 17 in 1998, but an injury to Couture forced the cancellation of the bout. They wrestled each other in a freestyle match at the 1989 Olympic Festival at Oklahoma State University; Coleman won the match by one point. Couture modified his training for this bout, focusing on catch wrestling and refining his boxing under coach Gil Martinez. The combined age of these fighters (91) is the highest in any UFC match. Couture made Coleman pass out to a rear-naked choke submission in the second round, getting his first submission win in over four years.

Couture was scheduled to fight Rich Franklin at UFC 115, but Franklin instead fought Chuck Liddell, replacing Liddell's original opponent, Tito Ortiz. Couture instead faced three-time boxing world champion James Toney at UFC 118. Couture dominated Toney, taking him down and mounting him within seconds, and quickly making him submit to an arm triangle choke. The match achieved notoriety, though it drew criticisms of being a freak show fight, among them by UFC President Dana White himself. Many also felt that this fight had been made as an attempt to repair damage done to the credibility of MMA after Ray Mercer knocked out former UFC Heavyweight Champion Tim Sylvia.

Couture had stated he was interested in fighting either Lyoto Machida or Maurício Rua (in a non-title bout). Since Rua had an upcoming title defense against Jon Jones, UFC matchmakers gave him Machida. They fought on April 30, 2011, at UFC 129, before 55,000 fans in Toronto. Couture had stated before the bout it would be his final fight. Machida knocked him out in the second round with a jumping front kick. After the fight, Couture announced he was "finally done fighting", at the age of 47.

Bellator Fighting Championships
On January 29, 2013, Couture signed with Bellator to be a coach in the first season of their reality show, Fight Master: Bellator MMA which debuted in June 2013. Couture also did commentary for Bellator 96.

Acting
Couture made a cameo appearance in the direct-to-video Steven Seagal film Today You Die and on the season finale of the CBS show The Unit, as a military guard. He played fight commentator Terry Flynn in the film Redbelt. He appeared on an episode of The History Channel show Human Weapon on September 27, 2007, and starred in the 2008 film The Scorpion King 2: Rise of a Warrior. He played Toll Road in the 2010 movie The Expendables and reprised the role in the 2012 and 2014 sequels. He did several public service announcements, one against crystal meth. He starred alongside 50 Cent and Bruce Willis in the 2011 film, Setup, as an enforcer named Petey.

In 2012, he played the leading role of hard-bitten cop Paul Ross in Brandon Nutt's action film Hijacked, alongside Dominic Purcell.

On September 4, 2014, it was announced that Couture would be one of the celebrities competing on the 19th season of Dancing with the Stars. He paired with professional dancer Karina Smirnoff. The couple was eliminated on the third week of competition finishing in eleventh place.

Couture has appeared in 4 episodes of the TV series Hawaii Five-0 as Jason Duclair.

Couture appeared on Impractical Jokers as a guest during Sal Vulcano's punishment in the episode "Pantsing with the Stars". In that episode, Vulcano, who refused an instruction during a challenge where he was posing as a Krav Maga instructor, was given a surprise punishment by the other Jokers in that he then had to wrestle Couture and attempt to “pants” him.

In 2019, Couture starred alongside Luke Goss and Michael Jai White in the movie The Hard Way which was among the most popular watched movies on Netflix.

In July, 2019, Couture appeared on an episode of the Outdoor Channel show Gunnytime entitled "Teamwork Makes the Dream Work".

Personal life
Couture was previously married to Sharon, Tricia, and Kim Couture (née Borrego). He and Kim filed for divorce in May 2009. He continued to coach her and support her MMA career. He has three children, including Ryan. He often works with and is the long-term partner of model and actress Mindy Robinson.

Asked if MMA could be improved, he suggested health insurance, retirement plans as well as more equal compensation regarding other athletes and sports. He lives in Las Vegas.
He enjoys hunting.

In 2012 Randy Couture was inducted into the International Sports Hall of Fame (ISHOF) presented by sports legend Dr. Robert M. Goldman.

On October 23, 2019, Couture suffered a heart attack after training and walked himself to a nearby hospital. Following a successful operation, Couture made a full recovery.

Championships and accomplishments

Greco-Roman wrestling
Pan American Games
Pan American Championship Greco-Roman Seniors 90 kg – second place (June 13, 1990)
Pan American Championship Greco-Roman Seniors 90 kg – winner (January 1, 1991)
Pan American Championship Greco-Roman Seniors 90 kg – second place (January 1, 1992)
Pan American Championship Greco-Roman Seniors 97 kg – third place (May 21, 1997)
Pan American Championship Greco-Roman Seniors 97 kg – second place (March 24, 1998)
Pan American Games Greco-Roman Seniors 90 kg – winner (August 6, 1991)
FILA Wrestling World Championships
FILA test tournament Greco-Roman Seniors 97 kg – third place (March 14, 1998)
FILA World Cup Greco-Roman Seniors 90 kg – third place (November 9, 1991)
FILA World Cup Greco-Roman Seniors 90 kg – third place (November 21, 1992)

Collegiate wrestling
National Collegiate Athletic Association
NCAA Division I All-American (1990, 1991, 1992)
NCAA Division I 190 lb/86.4 kg – 6th place out of Oklahoma State University (1990)
NCAA Division I 190 lb/86.4 kg – Runner-up out of Oklahoma State University (1991)
NCAA Division I 190 lb/86.4 kg – Runner-up out of Oklahoma State University (1992)

Mixed martial arts
Ultimate Fighting Championship
UFC Hall of Fame
UFC 13 Heavyweight Tournament Champion
UFC Heavyweight Championship (3 times)
UFC Light Heavyweight Championship (2 times)
Interim UFC Light Heavyweight Championship (1 time)
UFC Viewer's Choice Award
Fight of the Night (two times)
First multi-divisional champion in UFC history
First & only fighter that was a multi-divisional champion that won back the title after losing it (2x at Heavyweight & 1x at Light Heavyweight)
Most championship fights in UFC history (15)
Most championship reigns in UFC history (6)
Most main event bouts in UFC history (18) – tied with Anderson Silva
Oldest fighter to be a champion in UFC history (45 years, 60 days)
Oldest fighter to win a championship in UFC history (43 years 255 days)
Oldest fighter to defend a championship successfully (44 years Old)
Oldest fighter to win a bout in UFC history (47 years, 68 days)
Black Belt Magazine
1997 Full-Contact Competitor of the Year
Black Belt Magazine Hall of Famer
George Tragos/Lou Thesz Professional Wrestling Hall of Fame
2013 George Tragos award
Inside Fights
2009 Fight of the Year – vs. Antônio Rodrigo Nogueira on August 29
Wrestling Observer Newsletter
2001 Fight of the Year vs. Pedro Rizzo on May 4
2003 Most Outstanding Fighter
2007 MMA Most Valuable Fighter
MMA Most Valuable Fighter of the Decade (2000s)
World MMA Awards
2010 Outstanding Contribution to MMA Award
MMA Freak
MMA Freak Hall of Fame Class of 2013

Mixed martial arts record

|-
| Loss
| align=center| 19–11
| Lyoto Machida
| KO (front kick)
| UFC 129
| 
| align=center| 2
| align=center| 1:05
| Toronto, Ontario, Canada
| 
|-
| Win
| align=center| 19–10
| James Toney
| Submission (arm-triangle choke)
| UFC 118
| 
| align=center| 1
| align=center| 3:19
| Boston, Massachusetts, United States
| 
|-
| Win
| align=center| 18–10
| Mark Coleman
| Submission (rear-naked choke)
| UFC 109
| 
| align=center| 2
| align=center| 1:09
| Las Vegas, Nevada, United States
| 
|-
| Win
| align=center| 17–10
| Brandon Vera
| Decision (unanimous)
| UFC 105
| 
| align=center| 3
| align=center| 5:00
| Manchester, United Kingdom
| 
|-
| Loss
| align=center| 16–10
| Antônio Rodrigo Nogueira
| Decision (unanimous)
| UFC 102
| 
| align=center| 3
| align=center| 5:00
| Portland, Oregon, United States
| 
|-
| Loss
| align=center| 16–9
| Brock Lesnar
| TKO (punches)
| UFC 91
| 
| align=center| 2
| align=center| 3:07
| Las Vegas, Nevada, United States
| 
|-
| Win
| align=center| 16–8
| Gabriel Gonzaga
| TKO (punches)
| UFC 74
| 
| align=center| 3
| align=center| 1:37
| Las Vegas, Nevada, United States
| 
|-
| Win
| align=center| 15–8
| Tim Sylvia
| Decision (unanimous)
| UFC 68
| 
| align=center| 5
| align=center| 5:00
| Columbus, Ohio, United States
| 
|-
| Loss
| align=center| 14–8
| Chuck Liddell
| KO (punch)
| UFC 57
| 
| align=center| 2
| align=center| 1:28
| Las Vegas, Nevada, United States
| 
|-
| Win
| align=center| 14–7
| Mike van Arsdale
| Submission (anaconda choke)
| UFC 54
| 
| align=center| 3
| align=center| 0:52
| Las Vegas, Nevada, United States
|
|-
| Loss
| align=center| 13–7
| Chuck Liddell
| KO (punches)
| UFC 52
| 
| align=center| 1
| align=center| 2:06
| Las Vegas, Nevada, United States
| 
|-
| Win
| align=center| 13–6
| Vitor Belfort
| TKO (doctor stoppage)
| UFC 49
| 
| align=center| 3
| align=center| 5:00
| Las Vegas, Nevada, United States
| 
|-
| Loss
| align=center| 12–6
| Vitor Belfort
| TKO (doctor stoppage)
| UFC 46
| 
| align=center| 1
| align=center| 0:49
| Las Vegas, Nevada, United States
| 
|-
| Win
| align=center| 12–5
| Tito Ortiz
| Decision (unanimous)
| UFC 44
| 
| align=center| 5
| align=center| 5:00
| Las Vegas, Nevada, United States
| 
|-
| Win
| align=center| 11–5
| Chuck Liddell
| TKO (punches)
| UFC 43
| 
| align=center| 3
| align=center| 2:39
| Las Vegas, Nevada, United States
| 
|-
| Loss
| align=center| 10–5
| Ricco Rodriguez
| TKO (submission to elbow)
| UFC 39
| 
| align=center| 5
| align=center| 3:04
| Montville, Connecticut, United States
| 
|-
| Loss
| align=center| 10–4
| Josh Barnett
| TKO (punches)
| UFC 36
| 
| align=center| 2
| align=center| 4:35
| Las Vegas, Nevada, United States
| 
|-
| Win
| align=center| 10–3
| Pedro Rizzo
| TKO (punches)
| UFC 34
| 
| align=center| 3
| align=center| 1:38
| Las Vegas, Nevada, United States
| 
|-
| Win
| align=center| 9–3
| Pedro Rizzo
| Decision (unanimous)
| UFC 31
| 
| align=center| 5
| align=center| 5:00
| Atlantic City, New Jersey, United States
| 
|-
| Loss
| align=center| 8–3
| Valentijn Overeem
| Submission (guillotine choke)
| rowspan=2|Rings: King of Kings 2000 Final
| rowspan=2|
| align=center| 1
| align=center| 0:56
| rowspan=2|Tokyo, Japan
| 
|-
| Win
| align=center| 8–2
| Tsuyoshi Kohsaka
| Decision (unanimous)
| align=center| 2
| align=center| 5:00
| 
|-
| Win
| align=center| 7–2
| Kevin Randleman
| TKO (punches)
| UFC 28
| 
| align=center| 3
| align=center| 4:13
| Atlantic City, New Jersey, United States
| 
|-
| Win
| align=center| 6–2
| Ryushi Yanagisawa
| Decision (majority)
| rowspan=2|Rings: King of Kings 2000 Block A
| rowspan=2|
| align=center| 2
| align=center| 5:00
| rowspan=2|Tokyo, Japan
|
|-
| Win
| align=center| 5–2
| Jeremy Horn
| Decision (unanimous)
| align=center| 3
| align=center| 5:00
| 
|-
| Loss
| align=center| 4–2
| Mikhail Ilyukhin
| Submission (kimura)
| Rings: Rise 1st
| 
| align=center| 1
| align=center| 7:43
| Japan
| 
|-
| Loss
| align=center| 4–1
| Enson Inoue
| Submission (armbar)
| Vale Tudo Japan 1998
| 
| align=center| 1
| align=center| 1:39
| Japan
| 
|-
| Win
| align=center| 4–0
| Maurice Smith
| Decision (majority)
| UFC Japan: Ultimate Japan
| 
| align=center| 1
| align=center| 21:00
| Yokohama, Kanagawa, Japan
| 
|-
| Win
| align=center| 3–0
| Vitor Belfort
| TKO (punches)
| UFC 15
| 
| align=center| 1
| align=center| 8:16
| Bay St. Louis, Mississippi, United States
| 
|-
| Win
| align=center| 2–0
| Steven Graham
| TKO (punches)
| rowspan=2|UFC 13
| rowspan=2|
| align=center| 1
| align=center| 3:13
| rowspan=2|Augusta, Georgia, United States
| 
|-
| Win
| align=center| 1–0
| Tony Halme
| Submission (rear-naked choke)
| align=center| 1
| align=center| 1:00
|

Pay-per-view bouts

Filmography

Video games

References

External links

Official website for Xtreme Couture Mixed Martial Arts

Randy Couture profile at the National Wrestling Hall of Fame
Official UFC Profile
Randy Couture Quotes
MMA Freak Hall of Fame

1963 births
Living people
American male mixed martial artists
Mixed martial artists from Washington (state)
American male sport wrestlers
American strength and conditioning coaches
Mixed martial arts trainers
American male video game actors
American wrestling coaches
Heavyweight mixed martial artists
Light heavyweight mixed martial artists
Mixed martial arts broadcasters
Oklahoma State Cowboys wrestlers
Oregon State Beavers wrestling coaches
Sportspeople from Corvallis, Oregon
Ultimate Fighting Championship male fighters
Ultimate Fighting Championship champions
United States Army soldiers
American male film actors
American catch wrestlers
Pan American Games gold medalists for the United States
Pan American Games medalists in wrestling
People from Everett, Washington
People from Lynnwood, Washington
Wrestlers at the 1991 Pan American Games
Medalists at the 1991 Pan American Games
Mixed martial artists utilizing collegiate wrestling
Mixed martial artists utilizing Greco-Roman wrestling